This is a list of butterflies of Peninsular Malaysia. About 1,180 species are known from Peninsular Malaysia. The environment of Malaysia is varied and Malaysia's ecology is megadiverse, with a biodiverse range of flora and fauna found in various ecoregions throughout the country.

Papilionidae
Chilasa agestor shirozui
Chilasa clytia clytia—common mime
Chilasa paradoxa aenigma—great blue mime
Chilasa slateri perses
Graphium aristeus hermocrates—stripe swordtail
Graphium agamemnon agamemnon—tailed jay
Graphium arycles arycles—green jay
Graphium bathycles bathycloides—veined jay
Graphium chironides malayanum—striped jay
Graphium doson evemonides—common jay
Graphium doson kajanga
Graphium empedovana
Graphium eurypylus mecisteus—great jay
Graphium evemon eventus—blue jay
Graphium sarpedon luctatius—common bluebottle
Lamproptera curius curius—white dragontail
Lamproptera meges virescens—green dragontail
Meandrusa payeni ciminius
Pachliopta aristolochiae asteris—common rose
Pachliopta coon doubledayi—common clubtail
Pachliopta neptunus neptunus—yellow bodied clubtail
Papilio demoleus malayanus—lime butterfly
Papilio demolion demolion—banded swallowtail
Papilio helenus helenus—red Helen
Papilio iswara iswara—great Helen
Papilio iswaroides curtisi
Papilio mahadeva
Papilio memnon agenor—great Mormon
Papilio nephelus annulus
Papilio nephelus sunatus—black and white Helen
Papilio palinurus palinurus—banded peacock
Papilio paris paris—Paris peacock
Papilio polytes romulus—common Mormon
Papilio prexaspes prexaspes—blue Helen
Parides sycorax egertoni
Parides nox erebus
Parides varuna varuna
Pathysa agetes iponus
Pathysa antiphates itamputi—five bar swordtail
Pathysa antiphates pulauensis
Pathysa delessertii delessertii—Malayan zebra
Pathysa macareus macaristus
Pathysa macareus perakensis—lesser zebra
Pathysa megarus megapenthes
Pathysa megarus tiomanensis
Pathysa ramaceus pendleburyi—Pendlebury's zebra
Troides brookiana albescens—Rajah Brooke's birdwing
Troides brookiana mollumar
Troides aeacus thomsonii
Troides amphrysus ruficollis—Malayan birdwing
Troides cuneifera paeninsulae
Troides helena cerberus—common birdwing

Pieridae
Catopsilia pomona pomona—lemon emigrant
Catopsilia pyranthe pyranthe—mottled emigrant
Catopsilia scylla cornelia—orange emigrant
Dercas verhuelli herodorus
Eurema ada iona
Eurema andersonii andersonii
Eurema blanda snelleni—three spot grass yellow
Eurema brigitta senna—no brand grass yellow
Eurema hecabe contubernalis—common grass yellow
Eurema lacteola lacteola
Eurema sari sodalis—chocolate grass yellow
Eurema simulatrix littorea
Eurema simulatrix tecmessa
Eurema simulatrix tiomanica
Eurema tilaha nicevillei
Gandaca harina aora
Gandaca harina distanti—tree yellow
Appias albina albina
Appias cardena perakana
Appias indra plana—plain puffin
Appias lalassis indroides
Appias libythea olferna—striped albatross
Appias lyncida vasava—chocolate albatross
Appias nero figulina—orange albatross
Appias pandione lagela—banded puffin
Appias paulina distanti—lesser albatross
Appias paulina grisea
Cepora iudith malaya—orange gull
Cepora iudith siamensis
Cepora iudith talboti
Cepora nadina andersoni—lesser gull
Cepora nerissa dapha—common gull
Delias acalis perakana
Delias agostina johnsoni
Delias baracasa dives
Delias belladonna malayana
Delias descombesi eranthos
Delias georgina keda
Delias georgina orphne
Delias georgina tahanica
Delias georgina zenobia
Delias hyparete metarete—painted Jezebel
Delias ninus ninus—Malayan Jezebel
Delias pasithoe parthenope—red-base Jezebel
Delias singhapura singhapura
Hebomoia glaucippe anomala
Hebomoia glaucippe aturia—great orange tip
Hebomoia glaucippe theia
Ixias pyrene alticola
Ixias pyrene birdi
Ixias pyrene verna—yellow orange tip
Leptosia nina malayana—Psyche
Leptosia nina nina
Pareronia anais—common wanderer
Pareronia valeria lutescens—wanderer
Phrissura aegis cynis—forest white
Phrissura aegis pryeri
Pieris canidia canidia—cabbage white
Pieris napi montana
Prioneris philonome themana—redspot sawtooth
Prioneris thestylis malaccana
Saletara liberia distanti—Malaysian albatross

Nymphalidae
Eulaceura osteria kumana—purple duke
Euripus nyctelius euploeoides—courtesan
Agatasa calydonia calydonia—glorious begum
Charaxes harmodius maruyamai
Charaxes bernardus crepax—tawny rajah
Charaxes borneensis praestantius
Charaxes distanti distanti
Charaxes durnfordi dumfordi
Charaxes marmax philosarcus—yellow rajah
Charaxes solon echo—black rajah
Polyura athamas athamas—common nawab
Polyura athamas uraeus
Polyura delphis concha—jewel nawab
Polyura eudamippus peninsularis
Polyura hebe chersonesus
Polyura hebe plautus—plain nawab
Polyura hebe takizawai
Polyura jalysus jalysus
Polyura moori moori
Polyura schreiber tisamenus—blue nawab
Prothoe franck uniformis—blue begum
Chersonesia intermedia intermedia
Chersonesia nicevillei
Chersonesia peraka peraka—little maplet
Chersonesia rahria rahria—wavy maplet
Chersonesia risa risa
Danaus affinis malayanus—Malay tiger
Danaus chrysippus chrysippus—plain tiger
Danaus genutia genutia—common tiger
Danaus melanippus hegesippus—black veined tiger
Euploea algea menetriesii
Euploea camaralzeman malayica—Malayan crow
Euploea camaralzeman paraclaudina
Euploea core graminifera—common Indian crow
Euploea crameri bremeri—spotted black crow
Euploea crameri crameri
Euploea doubledayi evalida
Euploea eunice leucogonis—blue branded king crow
Euploea eyndhovii gardineri—striped black crow
Euploea klugii erichsonii—brown king crow
Euploea midamus chloe
Euploea midamus singapura—blue spotted crow
Euploea modesta modesta
Euploea modesta tiomana
Euploea mulciber mulciber—striped blue crow
Euploea phaenareta castelnaui—king crow
Euploea radamanthus radamanthus—magpie crow
Euploea sylvester harrisii
Euploea sylvester tyrianthia
Euploea tulliolus ledereri—dwarf crow
Euploea tulliolus aristotelis
Idea hypermnestra linteata
Idea leuconoe chersonesia—mangrove tree nymph
Idea lynceus lynceus
Idea stolli logani—common tree nymph
Ideopsis gaura kajangensis
Ideopsis gaura perakana—smaller wood nymph
Ideopsis juventa sitah—grey glassy tiger
Ideopsis similis persimilis
Ideopsis vulgaris macrina—blue glassy tiger
Parantica aglea melanoides
Parantica agleoides agleoides—dark glassy tiger
Parantica aspasia aspasia—yellow glassy tiger
Parantica luzonensis aurensis
Parantica melaneus sinopion—chocolate tiger
Parantica sita ethologa—yellow glassy tiger
Tirumala gautama gautama
Tirumala limniace exotica
Tirumala septentrionis septentrionis—dark blue tiger
Acraea issoria—yellow coster
Acraea violae—tawny coster
Cethosia biblis pemanggilensis—red lacewing
Cethosia biblis perakana—red lacewing
Cethosia hypsea elioti
Cethosia hypsea hypsina—Malay lacewing
Cethosia penthesilea methypsea—plain lacewing
Cirrochroa emalea emalea—Malay yeoman
Cirrochroa malaya malaya
Cirrochroa orissa orissa—banded yeoman
Cirrochroa satellita satellita
Cirrochroa surya siamensis
Cirrochroa tyche aurica
Cirrochroa tyche rotundata—common yeoman
Cupha erymanthis lotis—rustic
Cupha erymanthis tiomana
Phalanta phalantha phalantha—leopard
Terinos atlita teuthras—great Assyrian
Terinos clarissa aurensis
Terinos clarissa malayanus—Malayan Assyrian
Terinos terpander robertsia—royal Assyrian
Terinos terpander tiomanensis
Vindula dejone erotella—cruiser
Libythea myrrha hecura
Libythea narina rohini
Athyma abiasa clerica
Athyma asura idita—studded sergeant
Athyma cama gynea
Athyma kanwa kanwa—dot-dash sergeant
Athyma larymna siamensis
Athyma nefte subrata—colour sergeant
Athyma perius perius—common sergeant
Athyma pravara helma—lance sergeant
Athyma ranga malaya
Athyma reta moorei—Malay staff sergeant
Athyma selenophora amharina—staff sergeant
Athyma selenophora selenophora
Euthalia aconthea gurda—baron
Euthalia adonia pinwilli—green baron
Euthalia merta merta—white tipped baron
Euthalia monina monina—Malay baron
Lasippa heliodore dorelia—Burmese lascar
Lasippa monata monata
Lasippa tiga siaka—Malayan lascar
Lasippa tiga camboja
Lebadea martha parkeri—knight
Lexias canescens pardalina
Lexias dirtea merguia—black archduke
Lexias pardalis dirteana—archduke
Moduza procris milonia—commander
Neptis harita harita—chocolate sailor
Neptis hylas papaja—common sailor
Neptis leucoporos cresina—grey sailor
Pandita sinope sinope
Pantoporia hordonia hordonia—common lascar
Pantoporia paraka paraka—Perak lascar
Phaedyma columella singa—short banded sailor
Tanaecia iapis puseda—Horsfield's baron
Tanaecia pelea pelea—Malay viscount
Amathusia binghami
Amathusia friderici holmanhunti
Amathusia masina malaya
Amathusia ochraceofusca ochraceofusca
Amathusia perakana perakana
Amathusia phidippus phidippus—palm king
Amathusia schoenbergi schoenbergi
Amathuxidia amythaon dilucida—koh-i-noor
Discophora necho engamon
Discophora sondaica despoliata—common duffer
Discophora timora perakensis—great duffer
Enispe intermedia corbeti
Faunis canens arcesilas—common faun
Faunis gracilis
Faunis kirata
Melanocyma faunula faunula—pallid faun
Taenaris horsfieldii birchi
Thaumantis klugius lucipor—dark blue jungle glory
Thaumantis noureddin noureddin—dark jungle glory
Thaumantis odana pishuna
Thauria aliris pseudaliris—tufted jungle king
Zeuxidia amethystus amethystus—Saturn
Zeuxidia aurelius aurelius—giant Saturn
Zeuxidia doubledayi doubledayi
Amnosia decora perakana
Argynnis hyperbius sumatrensis—Indian fritillary
Ariadne ariadne ariadne—angled castor
Ariadne isaeus isaeus
Ariadne merione ginosa—common castor
Ariadne specularia arca
Bassarona dunya dunya—great marquis
Bassarona recta monilis—red-spot marquis
Bassarona teuta goodrichi—banded marquis
Bassarona teuta rayana
Bassarona teuta tiomanica
Cyrestis cocles earli
Cyrestis maenalis martini—straight line mapwing
Cyrestis nivea nivalis
Cyrestis nivea pigmentosa
Cyrestis themire pemanggilensis
Cyrestis themire robinsoni
Cyrestis themire siamensis
Cyrestis themire themire
Dichorragia nesimachus deiokes—constable
Doleschallia bisaltide bisaltide—autumn leaf
Dophla evelina compta—red-spot duke Latin
Euthalia aconthea garuda
Euthalia adonia beata
Euthalia agnis paupera
Euthalia alpheda langkawica
Euthalia alpheda yamuna
Euthalia anosia bunaya
Euthalia djata rubidifascia
Euthalia djata siamica
Euthalia eriphylae raya
Euthalia ipona
Euthalia kanda marana
Euthalia lubentina lubentina
Euthalia mahadeva zichrina
Euthalia malaccana malaccana
Euthalia merta milleri
Euthalia merta tioma
Euthalia monina insularis
Euthalia phemius phemius
Euthalia whiteheadi mariae
Herona marathus angustata—yellow pasha
Herona sumatrana dusuntua
Hestina mimetica ruvanella
Hypolimnas anomala anomala—Malayan eggfly
Hypolimnas bolina bolina—great eggfly
Hypolimnas misippus misippus—Danaid eggfly
Junonia almana javana—peacock pansy
Junonia atlites atlites—grey pansy
Junonia hedonia ida—chocolate pansy
Junonia hedonia seitzi
Junonia hierta hierta—yellow pansy
Junonia iphita horsfieldi—chocolate soldier
Junonia lemonias lemonias—lemon pansy
Junonia orithya wallacei—blue pansy
Kallima limborgii amplirufa—leaf butterfly
Kaniska canace perakana—blue admiral
Laringa castelnaui castelnaui
Lebadea martha martha
Lexias cyanipardus sandakana—great archduke
Lexias dirtea iwasakii
Moduza procris procris
Moduza procris tioma
Neptis anjana hyria
Neptis clinia leuconata
Neptis clinioides gunongensis
Neptis duryodana nesia
Neptis ilira cindia
Neptis magadha charon
Neptis miah batara
Neptis nata gononata
Neptis omeroda omeroda
Neptis sankara peninsularis
Neptis sedata
Neptis soma pendleburyi
Paduca fasciata fasciata—little banded yeoman
Pantoporia aurelia aurelia
Pantoporia dindinga
Pantoporia sandaka sandaka
Parthenos sylvia lilacinus—clipper
Phaedyma columella parvimacula—short-banded sailer
Phalanta alcippe alcesta—small leopard
Phalanta alcippe aurica
Phalanta alcippe tiomana
Rhinopalpa polynice eudoxia—wizard
Rohana parisatis siamensis
Sephisa chandra stubbsi
Stibochiona nicea subucula
Sumalia agneya
Sumalia daraxa theoda
Symbrenthia hippoclus selangorana
Symbrenthia hypatia chersonesia
Symbrenthia hypselis sinis
Symbrenthia lilaea luciana—common jester
Tanaecia aruna aruna
Tanaecia clathrata violaria
Tanaecia cocytus cocytus
Tanaecia coelebs
Tanaecia flora andersonii
Tanaecia flora flora
Tanaecia godartii asoka—Malay count
Tanaecia godartii puloa
Tanaecia julii bougainvillei—common earl
Tanaecia julii xiphiones
Tanaecia lepidea matala
Tanaecia munda waterstradti
Tanaecia palguna consanguinea
Tanaecia pelea irenae
Vagrans egista macromalayana—vagrant
Vanessa indica indica—Indian red admiral
Vindula dejone rafflesi
Vindula dejone tiomana
Vindula erota chersonesia
Vindula erota erota—common cruiser
Yoma sabina vasuki
Coelites epiminthia epiminthia
Coelites euptychioides humilis
Elymnias casiphone saueri
Elymnias dara darina
Elymnias esaca esaca
Elymnias harterti harterti
Elymnias hypermnestra agina—common palmfly
Elymnias hypermnestra discrepans
Elymnias hypermnestra nimota
Elymnias hypermnestra tinctoria
Elymnias kamara erinyes
Elymnias kuenstleri kuenstleri
Elymnias nesaea lioneli—tiger palmfly
Elymnias panthera panthera—tawny palmfly
Elymnias panthera tiomanica
Elymnias patna hanitschi
Elymnias penanga penanga—pointed palmfly
Erites angularis angularis
Erites argentina delia
Erites elegans distincta
Erites medura russelli
Ethope diademoides hislopi
Lethe chandica namura
Lethe confusa enima—banded tree brown
Lethe europa malaya—bamboo tree brown
Lethe mekara gopaka—common red forester
Lethe minerva minerva
Lethe sinorix vanda
Lethe verma robinsoni—straight treebrown
Lethe vindhya luaba
Melanitis leda leda—common evening brown
Melanitis phedima abdullae—dark evening brown
Melanitis zitenius auletes
Mycalesis anapita anapita
Mycalesis anaxias senoi
Mycalesis anaxioides
Mycalesis dohertyi dohertyi
Mycalesis fusca fusca—Malayan bush brown
Mycalesis horsfieldi hermana
Mycalesis intermedia distanti
Mycalesis janardana sagittigera—common bush brown
Mycalesis maianeas maianeas
Mycalesis mineus macromalayana—dark brand bush brown
Mycalesis mnasicles perna
Mycalesis oroatis ustulata—red bush brown
Mycalesis orseis nautilus—purple bush brown
Mycalesis patiana
Mycalesis perseoides perseoides
Mycalesis perseus cepheus—dingy bush brown
Mycalesis visala phamis—long brand bush brown
Neorina lowii neophyta—Malayan owl
Orsotriaena medus cinerea—nigger
Ragadia crisilda critolina
Ragadia makuta siponta—Malayan ringlet
Xanthotaenia busiris busiris—yellow barred
Ypthima baldus newboldi—common five ring
Ypthima dohertyi mossmani
Ypthima fasciata torone—common six ring
Ypthima horsfieldii humei
Ypthima huebneri—common four ring
Ypthima pandocus corticaria—common three ring
Ypthima pandocus tahanensis
Ypthima philomela philomela
Ypthima savara tonkiniana

Riodinidae
Abisara geza niya
Abisara kausambi kausambi
Abisara kausambi kausambi
Abisara neophron chelina
Abisara saturata kausambioides—Malayan plum Judy
Abisara savitri savitri—Malay tailed Judy
Dodona deodata anu
Dodona egeon confluens—orange Punch
Dodona eugenes chaseni
Laxita thuisto thuisto—lesser harlequin
Paralaxita damajanti damajanti—Malay red harlequin
Paralaxita orphna laocoon—banded harlequin
Paralaxita telesia lyclene—Malay red harlequin
Stiboges nymphidia nymphidia
Taxila haquinus haquinus—harlequin
Zemeros emesoide emesoides
Zemeros flegyas albipunctatus—Punchinello
Zemeros flegyas allica—common Punchinello

Lycaenidae
Curetis bulis stigmata—bright sunbeam
Curetis felderi
Curetis freda
Curetis insularis pseudoinsularis
 Curetis regula —regular sunbeam
Curetis santana malayica —Malayan sunbeam
Curetis saronis sumatrana—Sumatran sunbeam
Curetis sperthis kawazoei
[[Curetis sperthis|Curetis sperthis sperthis]]Curetis tagalica jopaCuretis tagalica labuanaCigaritis kutuCigaritis lohita senama—long-banded silverlineCigaritis seliga seligaCigaritis syama terana—club silverlineAcupicta bubasesAcupicta flemingiAcytolepis puspa lambi—common hedge blueAcytolepis puspa volumniaAmblypodia anita anita—purple leaf blueAmblypodia anita parvaAmblypodia narada taooanaAncema blanka blanka—silver royalAncema ctesia ctesia—bi-spot royalAnthene emolus goberus—ciliate blueAnthene licates dusuntuaAnthene lycaenina miya—pointed ciliate blueAraotes lapithis uruwela—witchArhopala abseus abseusArhopala ace aceArhopala achelous achelousArhopala achelous maluArhopala actaArhopala aedias agnis —large metallic oakblueArhopala aedias meritatasArhopala agabaArhopala agelastus agelastusArhopala agelastus perissaArhopala agesiasArhopala agesilaus gesaArhopala agrata agrataArhopala aida aida —white-stained oakblueArhopala aida ophirArhopala alaconia mediaArhopala alitaeus mirabellaArhopala alitaeus pardenasArhopala allata pandoraArhopala ammon ammonArhopala ammonides chunsuArhopala ammonides monavaArhopala amphimuta amphimutaArhopala amphimuta millerianaArhopala anarteArhopala anellaArhopala antimuta antimutaArhopala ariana wilcocksiArhopala arianagaArhopala arielArhopala aroa aroaArhopala arvina adalitasArhopala athada athada —vinous oakblueArhopala atosia jaharaArhopala atosia malayana —tailed disc oakblueArhopala aureaArhopala aureliaArhopala avathaArhopala avathina avathinaArhopala azinis azinisArhopala barami penangaArhopala bazaloides bazaloidesArhopala bazalus zalinda—powdered oak blueArhopala belphoebe cowaniArhopala buddha cooperiArhopala caecaArhopala camdana camdanaArhopala cardoniArhopala centaurus nakula —centaur oakblueArhopala cleander aphadantasArhopala corinda acestesArhopala corinda corestesArhopala deltaArhopala democritus democritus —white-dot oakblueArhopala democritus lycaenariaArhopala dispar pendleburyiArhopala elizabethaeArhopala elopura elopuraArhopala epimete duessaArhopala epimete suedasArhopala epimuta epiala —common disc oakblueArhopala eumolphus maxwelli—green oakblueArhopala evansiArhopala fulla ignaraArhopala fulla intacaArhopala havilandi kotaArhopala hellada ozanaArhopala hellenore siroesArhopala horsfieldi basiviridisArhopala horsfieldi eurysthenesArhopala hypomuta hypomutaArhopala ijanensisArhopala inornata inornataArhopala johoreana johoreanaArhopala kinabalaArhopala kurziArhopala labuanaArhopala luridaArhopala major majorArhopala major parvimaculataArhopala metamuta metamutaArhopala milleriArhopala moolaiana mayaArhopala moolaiana yajunaArhopala moorei busaArhopala muta marandaArhopala myrzala conjunctaArhopala myrzala lammasArhopala myrzalinaArhopala norda nordaArhopala norda rondaArhopala normaniArhopala opalina azataArhopala overdijkinki undaArhopala paraganesa mendavaArhopala paraleaArhopala perimuta reginaArhopala phaenops sandakaniArhopala phanda phandaArhopala pseudocentaurus dixoniArhopala pseudomuta ariavanaArhopala pseudomuta pseudomuta —Raffles' oakblueArhopala sceva indraArhopala selta hislopiArhopala semperi russelliArhopala silhetensis adorea—Sylhet oakblueArhopala silhetensis silhetensisArhopala similisArhopala sintanga taniArhopala stingaArhopala stubbsiArhopala sublustris ridleyiArhopala trogonArhopala tropaeaArhopala varro selamaArhopala vihara hiravaArhopala vihara viharaArhopala wildeyana haveaArhopala wildeyana wildeyanaArhopala zambra zambraArhopala zylda eliotiArtipe anna Artipe eryx excellens — green flashAustrozephyrus absolon malayicusBindahara phocides phocides—planeBritomartis cleoboides vigaBullis buto cowaniBullis elioti eliotiBullis stigmataCaleta elna elvira—elbowed PierrotCaleta elna epeusCaleta roxus pemanggilensisCaleta roxus pothus—straight PierrotCaleta roxus rhodoidesCallenya lenya lenyaCastalius rosimon rosimon—common PierrotCatapaecilma elegans zephyriaCatapaecilma evansi evansiCatapaecilma lilaCatapaecilma major emas —gray tinselCatochrysops panormus exiguus—silver forget-me-notCatochrysops strabo strabo—forget-me-notCatopyrops ancyra—Ancyra blueCebrella pellecebra mouitoniCebrella pellecebra pellecebraCelastrina lavendularis isabella—plain hedge blueCharana mandarina splendidaChelakina nigerrima keriongaCheritra freja friggaCheritra freja frigga—common imperialChilades lajus tavoyanus—lime blueChliaria balua gabrieliChliaria kina celastroidesChliaria othona semangaChliaria pahangaCreon cleobis queda—broadtail royalDacalana burmanaDacalana cremera ricardiDacalana sinhara sinharaDacalana vidura azyadaDeudorix eliotiDeudorix epijarbas cinnabarus—cornelianDeudorix hypargyria hypargyriaDeudorix staudingeriDeudorix sumatrensisDiscolampa ethion thalimar—banded blue PierrotDrina cowaniDrina donina usiraDrina maneiaDrupadia cinesoidesDrupadia estella sempernaDrupadia johorensis Drupadia niasica birantaDrupadia niasica perlisaDrupadia ravindra caeruleaDrupadia ravindra moorei—common posyDrupadia rufotaenia rufotaenia—pygmy posyDrupadia scaevaDrupadia theda renongaDrupadia theda thesmia—dark posyEooxylides tharis distanti —branded imperialEuchrysops cnejus cnejus—gram blueEveres lacturnus rileyi—Indian CupidFlos anniella anniellaFlos anniella artegalFlos apidanus ahamusFlos apidanus saturatus—plain plushblueFlos aresteFlos diardi capeta—bifid plushblueFlos fulgida singhapuraFlos morphine morphinaHeliophorus epicles tweediei—purple sapphireHeliophorus ila malaya —restricted purple sapphireHoraga albimacula albistigmata—brown onyxHoraga amethystus purpurescensHoraga araotinaHoraga chalcedonyx malayaHoraga onyx sardonyx—common onyxHoraga syrinx maenala—Ambon onyxHypochrysops coelisparsus kerriHypolycaena amabilis lisbaHypolycaena erylus teatus—common titHypolycaena merguia skapaneHypolycaena thecloides thecloidesIonolyce helicon merguiana—pointed line blueIraota distanti distantiIraota rochana boswelliana—scarce silverstreakIraota timoleon wickii—silver streak blueJacoona anasuja anasuja—great imperialJamides abdul abdulJamides abdul pemanggilensisJamides alecto ageladas—metallic caeruleanJamides aratus adanaJamides bochus nabonassar—dark caeruleanJamides caeruleus caeruleus—sky blueJamides celeno aelianus—common caeruleanJamides cyta minnaJamides elpis pseudelpis—glistering caeruleanJamides ferrari evansiJamides malaccanus aurensisJamides malaccanus malaccanus—soldier caeruleanJamides parasaturatus paramalaccanusJamides philatus subditusJamides pura puraJamides talingaJamides virgulatus nisancaJamides zebra lakattiLampides boeticus—pea blue / long-tailed blueLoxura atymnus fuconius—yamflyLoxura cassiopeia cassiopeia—larger yamflyLuthrodes pandava pandava—cycad blueLycaenopsis haraldus haraldusMahathala ariadeva ariadevaManto hypoleuca terana—green imperialMantoides gama gamaMegisba malaya sikkima—MalayanMonodontides musina musinaNacaduba angusta kerriana—white four-line blueNacaduba berenice icena—rounded six-line blueNacaduba beroe neonNacaduba calauria malayicaNacaduba hermus swatipaNacaduba kirtoniNacaduba kurava nemana—transparent six line blueNacaduba pactolus odon—large four-line blueNacaduba pavana singapuraNacaduba pavana vajuvaNacaduba pendleburyi penangensisNacaduba pendleburyi pendleburyi—Malayan four-line blueNacaduba russelliNacaduba sanaya elioti—jewel four-line blueNacaduba soltaNacaduba subperusia intricataNacaduba subperusia lysaNeocheritra amrita amrita—grand imperialNeocheritra fabronia linaNeomyrina nivea hiemalisNeomyrina nivea periculosaNeopithecops zalmora zalmora—QuakerNiphanda asialisNiphanda cymbia cymbiaNiphanda stubbsiNiphanda tessellata tessellataOreolyce archena archenaPetrelaea danaPithecops corvus corvus—forest QuakerPithecops fulgens fulgensPlautella cossaea parnbuiPlautella cossaea sonchusPratapa deva relataPratapa icetas sakaiaPratapa icetoides calculisProsotas aluta nandaProsotas bhuteaProsotas dubiosa lumpura—tailless line blueProsotas gracilis niProsotas lutea sivokaProsotas nelidesProsotas nora superdates—common line-blueProsotas pia piaPseudotajuria donatana donatana—golden royalPurlisa gigantea giganteaRachana jalindra burbona—banded royalRapala cowaniRapala damonaRapala dumaRapala domitia domitia—yellow flashRapala domitia flemingiRapala hadesRapala iarbus iarbus—common red flashRapala manea chozeba—slate flashRapala nissa pahanganaRapala pheretima sequeira—copper flashRapala pheretima tiomanaRapala rhodopisRapala rhoecus rhoecusRapala scintilla scintillaRapala suffusa barthema—suffused flashRapala varuna orseis—indigo flashRemelana jangala travana—chocolate royalRitra aurea volumniaSemanga superba deliciosaSinthusa malika amataSinthusa nasaka amba—narrow sparkSithon nedymond ismarusSithon nedymond nedymond—plushSuasa lisides suessaSurendra florimelSurendra vivarna amisena—acacia blueTajuria albiplaga alixaeTajuria berenis larutensisTajuria cippus maxentius—peacock royalTajuria deudorix ingeniTajuria dominus dominusTajuria inexpectataTajuria isaeus vernaTajuria ister tussisTajuria luculenta taoranaTajuria maculata—spotted royalTajuria mantra mantra—Felder's royalTajuria megistia thriaTajuria suniaTajuria yajna selangoranaTarucus waterstradti vilejaThamala marciana marcianaThamala marciana sarupaThrix scopula nisibisTicherra acte livianaTongeia potanini glycon—dark CupidUdara akasa catullusUdara albocaerulea scharffi—albocaeruleanUdara aristinus klossiUdara camenae pendleburyiUdara coalita brigaUdara cyma cymaUdara dilecta dilecta—pale hedge blueUdara placidula irenaeUdara rona catiusUdara selma tanarataUdara toxopeusi toxopeusiUna usta ustaVirachola kessuma deliochus—pitcher blueVirachola smilis smilisVirachola subguttata malayaYasoda pita dohertyiYasoda pitane larutaZeltus amasa maximinianus—fluffy titZinaspa todara karenniaZizeeria karsandra—dark grass blueZizeeria maha serica—pale grass blueZizina otis lampa—lesser grass blueZizula hylax pygmaea—pygmy grass blueAllotinus albifasciatusAllotinus apries apriesAllotinus borneensisAllotinus corbetiAllotinus davidisAllotinus fabius arriusAllotinus fallax apusAllotinus horsfieldi permagnusAllotinus leogoron leogoronAllotinus portunus maitusAllotinus sarrastesAllotinus strigatus malayanusAllotinus substrigosus substrigosusAllotinus subviolaceus subviolaceusAllotinus unicolor unicolor—lesser darkieLiphyra brassolis abbreviata—moth butterflyLogania distanti massaliaLogania malayica malayicaLogania marmorata damisLogania regina sriwaMiletus biggsii biggsii—Biggs's brownieMiletus chinensis learchus—common brownieMiletus gaesa gaesaMiletus gallus gallusMiletus gigantesMiletus gopara goparaMiletus heracleion heracleionMiletus nymphis fictusMiletus symethus petroniusMiletus symethus solitariusMiletus valuesSpalgis epius epius—apeflyTaraka hamada mendesia—lesser forest blueTaraka mahanetraCyaniriodes libna andersonii—emeraldDeramas alixaeDeramas antynaxDeramas anyxDeramas arshadorumDeramas basriiDeramas jasoda bradamanteDeramas jasoda jasodaDeramas livens livensDeramas nelvis nelvisDeramas nolens pasteuriPoritia erycinoides phraaticaPoritia hewitsoni talevaPoritia manilia evansiPoritia manilia maniliaPoritia phama rajataPoritia phama regiaPoritia philota philotaPoritia pleurataPoritia promula elegansPoritia sumatrae sumatrae—Sumatran GemSimiskina pasiraSimiskina pavonicaSimiskina pediadaSimiskina phalena phalenaSimiskina phalia potinaSimiskina pharyge deolina—blue brilliantSimiskina pheretia pheretiaSimiskina philura eliotiSimiskina proxima dohertyiSimiskina sibatikaHesperiidaeBadamia exclamationis—brown awlBibasis sena uniformis—orange-tail awlBurara etelka—great orange awletBurara gomata lalita—pale green awletBurara harisa consobrina—orange awletBurara jaina velvaBurara oedipodea—branded orange awletBurara owstoniBurara tuckeriChoaspes benjaminii flavens—Indian awl kingChoaspes hemixanthus furcatus—orange red skirtChoaspes plateni caudatusChoaspes subcaudatus crawfurdiHasora badra badra—common awlHasora chromus chromus—common banded awlHasora khoda minsonaHasora leucospila leucospila—violet awlHasora lizettaHasora mavisHasora mixta prabhaHasora mus pahangaHasora myra funebrisHasora quadripunctata gnaeusHasora salangaHasora schoenherr chuza—yellow banded awlHasora taminatus malayana—white banded awlHasora vitta vitta—plain banded awlHasora wilcocksiHasora zomaAcerbas anthea antheaAcerbas martiniAeromachus jhora cretaAeromachus pygmaeusAmpittia dioscorides camertes—bush hopperAncistroides armatus armatusAncistroides gemmifer gemmiferAncistroides nigrita maura—chocolate demonArnetta veronesAstictopterus jama jama—forest hopperBaoris farri farriBaoris oceia—paintbrush swiftBaoris penicillataBorbo cinnara cinnara—Formosan swiftCaltoris bromus bromusCaltoris brunnea caereCaltoris cahira austeniCaltoris cormasaCaltoris malayaCaltoris philippina philippinaCaltoris plebeiaCaltoris sirius fuscaCaltoris tulsi tulsiCephrenes acalle klianaCephrenes acalle niasicusCephrenes trichopepla—yellow palm dartCupitha purreea—waxy dartEetion elia—white spot palmerErionota acroleuca apicalisErionota harmachisErionota hislopiErionota sybiritaErionota thrax thrax—banana skipperErionota torusGangara lebadea lebadea—banded redeyeGangara sanguinocculus—small redeyeGangara thyrsis thyrsis—giant redeyeGe getaHalpe arcuataHalpe auriferaHalpe claraHalpe elanaHalpe flavaHalpe hauxwelliHalpe hieronHalpe insignisHalpe kusalaHalpe ormenes vilasina—dark banded aceHalpe pelethronix pelethronixHalpe porus—Moore's aceHalpe sikkimaHalpe toxopeaHalpe veluvana brevicornisHalpe wantonaHalpe zema zambaHalpe zinda zodiaHidari bhawaniHidari doesoena doesoenaHidari irava—coconut skipperHyarotis adrastus praba—tree flitterHyarotis iaderaHyarotis microsticta microstictaHyarotis stubbsiIambrix distantiIambrix salsala salsala—chestnut bobIambrix stellifer—starry bobIdmon obliquans obliquansIsma bononia bononiaIsma bononoidesIsma cronusIsma damoclesIsma feralia lenyaIsma flemingiIsma guttulifera kualaIsma hislopiIsma iapis iapisIsma miostictaIsma protoclea obscuraIsma umbrosa umbrosaIton semamora semamoraKoruthaialos butleriKoruthaialos rubecula rubecula—narrow-banded velvetKoruthaialos sindu sinduLotongus avestaLotongus calathus calathusMatapa aria—common redeyeMatapa cresta—fringed redeyeMatapa deprivataMatapa drunaMatapa sasivarnaNotocrypta clavata clavataNotocrypta clavata thebaNotocrypta curvifascia corindaNotocrypta feisthamelii alysos—spotted demonNotocrypta paralysos asawaNotocrypta paralysos varians—banded demonNotocrypta priaNotocrypta quadrataOerane microthyrus neaeraOriens gola pseudolus—common dartletOriens goloidesOriens paragolaParnara apostataParnara bada badaParnara gangaPelopidas agna agna—little branded swiftPelopidas assamensis—great swiftPelopidas conjunctus conjunctus—conjoined swiftPelopidas flavusPelopidas mathias mathias—small branded swiftPemara pugnans—pugnacious lancerPirdana distanti distantiPirdana hyela rudolphiiPithauria marsenaPithauria murdavaPithauria stramineipennisPlastingia naga—chequered lancerPlastingia pellonia—yellow chequered lancerPolytremis discrete discretePolytremis eltola corbeti—yellow-spot swiftPolytremis lubricans lubricans—contiguous swiftPolytremis minutaPotanthus chloePotanthus confucius dushtaPotanthus flavus alconPotanthus ganda gandaPotanthus juno junoPotanthus lydia fraseriPotanthus mingo ajaxPotanthus omaha omaha—lesser dartPotanthus pamelaPotanthus pava pavaPotanthus rectifasciatusPotanthus serinaPotanthus trachala tytleriPseudokerana fulgur—orange banded lancerPsolos fuligo fuligo—coonPyroneura agnesiaPyroneura aurantiaca montivagaPyroneura dernaPyroneura flavia fruhstorferiPyroneura helenaPyroneura klangaPyroneura latoia latoia—yellow vein lancerPyroneura natunaPyroneura niasana burmanaPyroneura perakana perakanaQuedara monteithi monteithiQuedara singularisSalanoemia fuscicornisSalanoemia salaSalanoemia similisSalanoemia tavoyanaScobura isotaScobura phiditiaScobura woollettiStimula swinhoeiSuada swerga suavaSuastus everyx everyxSuastus gremius gremius—palm bobSuastus minufus aditiaSuastus minutus flemingi—small-spot palm bobTaractrocera aliena alienaTaractrocera archias quintaTaractrocera ardonia lamiaTaractrocera ziclea zeniaTelicota augias augias—palm dartTelicota bambusae bambusaeTelicota besta bina—Besta palm dartTelicota colon stinga—pale palm dartTelicota hildaTelicota linnaTelicota ohara jixUdaspes folus—grass demonUnkana ambasa batara—hoary palmerUnkana mytheca mythecaXanthoneura corissa indrasanaZela cowaniZela eliotiZela excellensZela onara solexZela smaragdinaZela zenonZela zeroZela zeus optimaZela zeus zeusZographetus doxusZographetus kutuZographetus ogygia ogygiaZographetus ogygioidesZographetus rama—small flitterZographetus satwa—purple and gold flitterCapita hainanaCapita phanaeus ferreaCapita pieridoides sofaCelaenorrhinus asmara asmaraCelaenorrhinus aurivittatus cameroni—dark yellow-banded flatCelaenorrhinus ficulnea quedaCelaenorrhinus inaequalis ireneCelaenorrhinus ladanaCelaenorrhinus leucocera—common spotted flatCelaenorrhinus nigricans nigricansCelaenorrhinus pahangensisCelaenorrhinus putra sandaChamunda chamundaColadenia agniColadenia agnioidesColadenia laxmi sobrinaColadenia palawanaDarpa ptena dealbataDarpa striata striataGerosis limax dirae—black and white flatGerosis phisara phisara—white-banded flatGerosis sinica minimaGerosis tristisMooreana trichoneura trichoneuraOdina hieroglyphica ortina—hieroglyphic flatOdontoptilum angulatum angulatum—chestnut angleOdontoptilum pygela pygela—banded anglePintara pinwilli pinwilliPseudocoladenia dan dhyana—fulvous pied flatSarangesa dasahara dasaharaSatarupa gopala malayaSeseria affinis kirmanaTagiades calliganaTagiades cohaerens cindaTagiades gana gana—large snow flatTagiades japetus atticus—common snow flatTagiades lavatusTagiades litigiosus litigiosusTagiades menaka manis—dark edged snow flatTagiades parra naxosTagiades toba tobaTagiades ultraTagiades waterstradti talangaTapena thwaitesi bornea—black angle

 References 

William Lucas Distant (1882-1886) Rhopalocera Malayana: A description of the butterflies of the Malay Peninsula  online
Corbet,  A.S.  and Pendlebury, H.M., 1993  The Butterflies of the Malay Peninsula Malaysian Nature Society; 4th edition revised by J.N. Eliot 
Fleming,  W. A., 1975 Butterflies of West Malaysia & Singapore'' Berkshire, Eng. : Classey Publications Two volumes  (volume 1)

External links
Futao ISSN 0916-1112 Series website

 
Butterflies
Malaysia
M
M
Malaysia
Lepidoptera of Malaysia